is a 2004 Japanese animated experimental feature film based on Robin Nishi's manga of the same name. It was planned, produced and primarily animated by Studio 4°C and adapted and directed by Masaaki Yuasa in his directorial debut, with chief animation direction and model sheets by Yūichirō Sueyoshi, art direction by Tōru Hishiyama and groundwork and further animation direction by Masahiko Kubo.

It is unusual among features other than anthology films in using a series of disparate visual styles to tell one continuous story. As Yuasa commented in a Japan Times interview, "Instead of telling it serious and straight, I went for a look that was a bit wild and patchy. I think that Japanese animation fans today don't necessarily demand something that's so polished. You can throw different styles at them and they can still usually enjoy it."

The film received a cult audience and was well received, winning multiple awards worldwide, and has been praised by directors Satoshi Kon and Bill Plympton.

Plot
Nishi is a 20-year-old NEET from Osaka with dreams of becoming a comic book artist. One evening, he runs into his childhood crush, Myon, on the subway. She takes him to her family's yakitori restaurant, where she introduces him to her father, her elder sister Yan, and her fiancé Ryo. Two yakuza, Atsu and a senior yakuza whom Atsu calls Aniki (literally 'brother', a term used by yakuza to refer to each other), enter looking for Myon's father, who had ostensibly seduced and stolen Atsu's girlfriend.

As Atsu threatens Myon at gunpoint, Ryo jumps to her defense, but Atsu knocks him unconscious. Atsu then prepares to rape Myon, who cries out for Nishi. Atsu turns on a terrified Nishi, placing his pistol against Nishi's anus and firing when Nishi finally musters the courage to yell out a threat, killing him instantly. The senior yakuza, offended by Atsu's lack of control, fatally shoots him.

Nishi is sentenced to a limbo where he encounters Kami-sama (God), a being whose physical image changes every fraction of a second. Kami-sama directs Nishi into a red portal where he will disappear, but at the last moment, Nishi declares he wants to return to life, and runs toward the opposite blue portal. Kami-sama, impressed by Nishi's sheer will to live, lets him escape.

Nishi returns to the moment just before Atsu pulled the trigger. This time, Nishi seizes Atsu's gun with his buttocks, and fatally shoots him. He, Yan and Myon all speed off in the yakuza's car, leaving the father and Ryo (still unconscious) behind. The yakuza follow them, threatening to frame them for armed robbery and murder. The boss has his men lead the trio to a dead end on a bridge, but Nishi steers the car off the bridge, and they are swallowed by an enormous whale.
 
Inside the whale, they meet an old man, who reveals he is a former yakuza who has been living inside the whale for more than 30 years. He shows them to the elaborate suspended house he has constructed over the 'sea' in the whale's belly. When Nishi's attempts to escape fail, the trio resign themselves to life inside the whale. Yan practices dancing and art, Myon practices swimming (a dream she gave up after reaching puberty), Nishi practices writing and drawing manga, and he and Myon finally become sexually intimate.

When the water level inside the whale begins rising, the old man explains that the whale is likely dying. They concoct a plan to make a motor boat using spare parts and fuel from the car they arrived in. On the day before the final match of the World Cup, the whale returns to Osaka and all four manage to escape.

As the four fly through the air, the film returns to its very first scene of Myon running from the yakuza, only this time her leg does not get caught in the door of the train, and the yakuza is left behind on the platform. This is followed by a lengthy montage, similar to that of the opening credits, showing the histories of the various characters. The phrase "This Story Has Never Ended" appears before the credits roll.

Cast
Voice cast
 Koji Imada as Nishi
 Sayaka Maeda as Myon
 Takashi Fujii as Old man (jiisan)
 Seiko Takuma as Yan
 Tomomitsu Yamaguchi as Ryō
 Toshio Sakata as Father of Myon and Yan (Myon to Yan no chichi)
 Jōji Shimaki as Yakuza boss (yakuza no bosu)
 Ken'ichi Chūjō as Atsu (yakuza member)
 Rintarō Nishi as Senior yakuza member (Aniki. lit. "brother". A term used by Yakuza to refer to each other).

Other crew
 Kōji Morimoto – animation director
 Shinichirō Watanabe – music producer

Production companies
 Studio 4°C
 Asmik Ace Entertainment
 Beyond C.
 Rentrack Japan Co. Ltd.

Other companies
 Gainax – animation
 Production I.G – animation

Production
The film's music, produced by Shinichirō Watanabe, as well as the score by Seiichi Yamamoto includes an image song by Fayray and piano performed by Yōko Kanno.

Release 
As of July 2011, the film's only home video release in a primarily English-speaking country is a region 4-locked, "PAL" DVD-Video released in Australia by Madman Entertainment in 2008, though the Japanese (region 2, "NTSC") DVDs have English subtitles for the feature itself. According to Tekkonkinkreet director Michael Arias, there was consideration for a release of the film on R1 DVD but it fell through. GKIDS announced that they licensed the film, which streamed on VRV Select on December 29, 2017 followed by a limited theatrical run in February 2018 and a home video release in spring 2018. On April Fool's Day in 2018, the movie aired on Adult Swim's Toonami block with Japanese audio and English subtitles.

Reception
The film has a 100% rating on Rotten Tomatoes, based on 12 reviews. The film's accolades include the Ōfuji Noburō Award at the 2005 Mainichi Film Awards and the Animation Division Grand Prize at the Japan Media Arts Festival in 2004, outranking nominee Howl's Moving Castle. Outside Japan, the film had its international premiere at the New York Asian Film Festival in June 2005. It had possibly its biggest success at the Fantasia Festival in Canada in July 2005, wherein it beat many live-action films to win all three of the festival's own jury awards it qualified for: Best Film, Best Director (tying with Gen Sekiguchi for Survive Style 5+) and Best Script. It also received an additional Special Award for "Visual Accomplishment", as well as placing first (Golden Prize) in the audience award for Best Animation Film and second (Silver Prize), behind Survive Style 5+, for Most Groundbreaking Film.

References

External links
 Official website via Internet Archive
 
 
 
 

2004 comedy films
2004 films
2004 anime films
Animated comedy films
Anime films based on manga
Comedy anime and manga
Metaphysical fiction films
Existentialist films
Films about reincarnation
Films about time travel
Japanese comedy films
Religious comedy films
Studio 4°C
Toonami
Yakuza films
Japanese avant-garde and experimental films
2000s avant-garde and experimental films
2000s Japanese-language films